Mir 1 may refer to:

 Mir, Soviet space station, first in the Mir series of stations, only completed station in the series
 Mir EO-1, Mir Principle Expedition 1
 Mir EP-1, Mir Visiting Expedition 1
 Mir-1 (sub) Russian DSV submarine
 mir-1 microRNA precursor family
 Mir-1, stream cipher algorithm

See also
 Mir (disambiguation)